Mannheim is a historic home and former grist mill located at San Mar, Washington County, Maryland, United States. The house is a 2-story, three-bay structure built of roughly coursed local limestone, with a one-story stone kitchen wing.  Also on the property is a large frame bank barn and a small board-and-batten service kitchen or wash house.  Nearby are the remains of a saw mill a large -story grist mill. The mill on this property, known as "Murray's Mill," was in operation through the 19th century.

It was listed on the National Register of Historic Places in 1979.

References

External links
, including photo from 1987, at Maryland Historical Trust

Houses on the National Register of Historic Places in Maryland
Houses in Washington County, Maryland
Grinding mills in Maryland
National Register of Historic Places in Washington County, Maryland
Grinding mills on the National Register of Historic Places in Maryland